Gabriel Rodrigues da Silva (born February 15, 1996) is a Brazilian football player who currently plays for Portuguese club Louletano.

Career

Club career
At the end of January 2019, it was announced that Rodrigues had joined the reserve team / U-23 squad of C.D. Aves. On 12 August 2019, he joined USL Championship side Indy Eleven.

In January 2020, he moved back to Portugal and joined Louletano.

References

External links

1996 births
Living people
Brazilian footballers
Brazilian expatriate footballers
J1 League players
USL Championship players
Campeonato de Portugal (league) players
Guarani FC players
São Paulo FC players
Sociedade Esportiva e Recreativa Caxias do Sul players
Indy Eleven players
Louletano D.C. players
Association football forwards
Brazilian expatriate sportspeople in Japan
Brazilian expatriate sportspeople in Portugal
Brazilian expatriate sportspeople in the United States
Expatriate footballers in Japan
Expatriate footballers in Portugal
Expatriate soccer players in the United States